Yance Sayuri (born 22 September 1997) is an Indonesian professional footballer who plays as a left-back or winger for Liga 1 club PSM Makassar. His twin brother Yakob is also a footballer and play for PSM Makassar.

Club career

PSM Makassar
Sayuri signed for Liga 1 club PSM Makassar in 2021. He made his league debut on 26 October against Persikabo 1973.

On 8 December 2022, Sayuri scored his first league goal for PSM Makassar in a 3–1 won over Persita Tangerang.

On 9 February 2023, Sayuri scored in a 4–1 home win over PS Barito Putera. Five days later, he scored the winning goal in a 2–1 win over Persib Bandung. On 5 March, he scored again in a 3–2 home win over Persis Solo.

Career statistics

Club

Notes

Honours

Individual
 Liga 1 Goal of the Month: December 2022

References

External links
 Yance Sayuri at Soccerway
 Yance Sayuri at Liga Indonesia

1997 births
Living people
Indonesian footballers
Liga 1 (Indonesia) players
PSM Makassar players
Association football midfielders
People from Yapen Islands Regency
Sportspeople from Papua
Indonesian twins
Twin sportspeople